Ejisu is a city in Greater Kumasi located along the Kumasi-Accra highway about 20 km from Kumasi. It is the capital of Ejisu Municipal Assembly, a municipality of the Ashanti Region, Ghana. This municipal is one of the 30 administrative and political Districts in the Ashanti Region of Ghana and it was established by Legislative Instrument (L.I) 1890.

References

Populated places in the Ashanti Region